Gourdin is a family name of French origin. Notable people with the surname include:

 Edward Gourdin (1897–1966), American athlete and jurist
 Noel Gourdin (born 1981), American musician
 Theodore Gourdin (1764–1826), American politician

See also
 Gourdin Island, Antarctica